Spurius Furius Fusus (  481–478 BC) was a Roman statesman from the early Republic, who served as consul in 481 BC alongside Caeso Fabius Vibulanus. During their term of office, the consuls campaigned against the Aequi and Veientes. Sources disagree on which consul fought which enemy: Livy says Furius had charge of the Veientes, but Dionysius of Halicarnassus puts him against the Aequi.

According to Dionysius, one "Servius Furius", generally identified as Spurius Furius, won a victory in 478 BC against the Aequi, but this event is not reported by Livy, and Münzer considers the notice to be of no historical value.

References
 
 Münzer, Friedrich (1910), "Furius 70", Realencyclopädie der classischen Altertumswissenschaft (RE, PW), volume 7, part 1, column 357.

5th-century BC Roman consuls
Fusus, Spurius
Ancient Roman generals